FIM Sidecar World Championship is the international sidecar racing championship. It is the only remaining original FIM road racing championship class that started in 1949.

It was formerly named Superside when the sidecars moved from being part of Grand Prix Motorcycles racing to being support events for the Superbike World Championship. In 2010 the FIM took over the management of the series from the Superside promoters, and the championship was called "FIM Sidecar World Championship". However, the FIM still uses the word Superside for promotion purposes, despite the demise of the Superside promoters.

The championship is raced over a number of rounds at circuits mainly in Europe, although other venues have been included in United States (Monterey), South Africa at Kyalami and Australia's Phillip Island.

History

Formative years

When the sidecar world championships began in 1949, they were dominated by unambiguous, orthodox outfits where a sidecar was attached to a conventional solo motorcycle. Rigidity and strength were poorly understood and pre-war machines have been described as "scaffolding on wheels". Development was based around cutting weight, providing a flat platform for the passenger, and reducing drag around the sidecar wheel and at the front of the sidecar platform. When developments in dolphin and dustbin fairings on solo machines proved successful at reducing drag, it was natural to adapt similar streamlined enclosures for the sidecar outfits. A pioneer in this area was Eric Oliver who worked with the Watsonian company on the development of successive experimental racing outfits including such innovations as the use of  diameter wheels.

Design changes
By 1953,  motorcycle frames had undergone a complete redesign to accommodate the side car. Seat heights had been reduced to the point where the driver now sat in a semi-prone position. This permitted the use of a one-piece fairing which enclosed the front of the outfit as well as the sidecar platform. The enclosure led to unfamiliar handling, and the advanced design was only used in practice for the Belgian Grand Prix and in the final Grand Prix at Monza, where it finished fourth in the hands of Jacques Drion and Inge Stoll. Throughout the year, other outfits experimented with more modest refinements such as additional braking via the sidecar wheel, sometimes linked to one or both of the other two brakes.

 
Nevertheless, racing sidecars remained intrinsically the same to road-going sidecars. A traditional racing outfit was a road-going motorcycle outfit without the boot and with the suspension lowered. The bootless sidecar frame would have a flat platform. Both the battery and the fuel tank could be placed either between the motorcycle and the sidecar, or on the sidecar platform. Over time the subframe, struts, clamps, sidecar frame, etc. would merge with the motorcycle mainframe and form a single frame. But essentially the racing outfit was still a variant of the road-going outfit in principle.

Technical innovation
Beginning in 1977 there was a seismic shift away from the traditional engineering that had underscored sidecar technology up to this point. It began when George O'Dell won the championship using a Hub-center steering sidecar (built by Rolf Biland) called the Seymaz. O'Dell won despite the Seymaz being rarely raced during the season in favor of using a traditional Windle frame for much of the year. The next year Rolf Biland won the 1978 championship using a BEO-Yamaha TZ500 sidecar which was basically a rear-engine, rear-drive trike.

In 1979 the FIM responded to these technological innovations by splitting the sidecar championship into two competitions: 
 B2A - traditional sidecars
 B2B - prototypes 
Bruno Holzer won the B2B championship with an LCR BEO-Yamaha sidecar that turned motorcycling into something more like driving a car because the machine had a driver's seat, steering wheel and using foot pedals. It also did not require much participation from the sidecar passenger who just had to lie flat on the passenger platform.

In 1980, due to the revolutionary changes being made by the constructors to their designs, the FIM banned all sidecar prototypes because it was concerned that the developments were turning passengers into non-active participants, and the machines were ceasing to resemble motorcycles.

However, a year later FIM reversed its decision and reached a compromise after protests from the teams. Prototypes would be permitted to race subject to the following rules: 
 it must be a vehicle that is driven only by a single rear wheel
 it must be steered by a single front wheel
 it must be steered by a motorcycle handle bar not a steering wheel 
 it must require the active participation from the passenger. 
The 1981 rules remain largely unchanged. For example, trikes or cyclecars are still banned. However, there have been a few amendments and easing of the rules. In the late 1990s the FIM allowed a sidecar front wheel to have automobile-style suspension (e.g.  wishbone configurations. Likewise sidecars that are outside of the technical rules are permitted to compete in races but their results, points or finishes are not recorded. An example is the Markus Bösiger/Jürg Egli team who would have finished third in the 1998 championship season. However, as they were using a configuration where Bösiger sat in an upright driving position no results were entered in the official records.

Under FIM regulations, "rider" applies equally to the driver and the passenger on a sidecar. The driver is positioned kneeling in front of the engine with hands near the front wheel, while the passenger moves about the platform at the rear transferring their weight from left to right according to the corner and forward or back to gain traction for the front or rear. The passenger also helps the driver when it comes to drifting, and is also usually the first person to notice any engine problems since he is next to the engine while the driver is in front of it. The two must work together to be a successful team. Nowadays it is common to call the driver the "Pilot", while the passenger has several nicknames: the "Acrobat" used in North America which is no longer in use, and the now common term "Monkey" which originated from Australia. Occasionally the words "Co-Driver" or "Co-Pilot" are also used.

Traditional sidecar racing remain popular in several countries, especially the United Kingdom, where it known as Formula Two Sidecars (600cc Engines). They are generally uses in true road racing events like the Isle of Man TT races. Despite their lower top speeds, these machines retain better manoeuvring capabilities.

Modern racing

Between 1981 and 2016 Superside machines were known as Formula One sidecars using a basic unchanged design. These modern high tech machines are only related to motorcycles by the classification of the engines they use. All chassis are purpose built and owe more to open wheel race car technology and the tires are wide and have a flat profile. They are sometimes known as "worms".

The most successful sidecar racer in Superside has been Steve Webster, who has won four world championships and six world cup between 1987 and 2004. The most successful chassis is LCR, the Swiss sidecar maker, whose founder Louis Christen has won 35 championships between 1979 and 2016, with a variety of engines, originally Yamaha and Krauser two-strokes, more lately Suzuki four-strokes.
The BMW Rennsport RS54 Engine powered to 19 straight constructors titles from 1955 to 1973, the most by any engines.

In 2014, for the first time a Kawasaki-powered machine won the title with Tim Reeves and Gregory Cluze ending an 11-year consecutive Suzuki run. In 2016 Kirsi Kainulainen became the first woman motorcycle world champion, as passenger to Pekka Päivärinta.

However, in 2017 the engine capacity of F1 sidecars was reduced from 1000cc to 600cc. This was a conscious effort by FIM to attract more participation from racers who still preferred the traditional F2 chassis. By reducing the engine size, it was hoped that this would mean competition on more equal terms. Nevertheless, the 2017 championship was still dominated by competitors using the F1 chassis. The highest placed F2 chassis team was 12th by Eckart Rösinger and Steffen Werner on their Baker-Suzuki GSX-R600.

Formats
Since 2005 there are now three types of race classes. Any given championship round can have all three type of races but sometimes there is only one type of race (the Gold Race) in one round, usually when the round is a supporting event of a major meeting such as MotoGP.

 Match Race. Teams are divided into groups and race in very short heat races. Winners and the better placing teams in these heats would advance to the next round (semi-finals), until only the best six teams left for the final heat race. A typical heat race distance is three laps.
 Sprint Race. All teams participate in a short race. A typical race distance is twelve laps.
 Gold Race. All teams participate in a long race, usually twice the distance of the sprint race.

FIM Sidecar World Champions

Grand Prix

Notes

Trivia 

 Werner Schwärzel and Karl Heinz Kleis was the first team to win a race (1974 German GP) using a 2-stroke engine (König), Steve Abbott and Jamie Biggs was the last team to win a race (1999 World Superbike Championship round 8 Brands Hatch) using a 2-stroke engine (Honda).
 Tim Reeves and Mark Wilkes won the first race of the season in France (Le Mans) using a German-made Adolf RS-Yamaha sidecar, thus ended LCR's winning every single race for the last 15 seasons dating back to 2003, the longest winning streak in the history of the championship by a single constructor.

References

External links
 FIM Sidecar World Championship FIM Sidecar World Championship Website

Sidecar racing
World motorcycle racing series
Fédération Internationale de Motocyclisme
Motorcycle racing by type